Myripristis is a genus of soldierfishes.

Species
There are currently 28 recognized species in this genus:
 Myripristis adusta Bleeker, 1853 (Shadowfin soldierfish)
 Myripristis amaena (Castelnau, 1873)  (Brick soldierfish)
 Myripristis astakhovi Kotlyar, 1997
 Myripristis aulacodes J. E. Randall & D. W. Greenfield, 1996
 Myripristis berndti D. S. Jordan & Evermann, 1903 (Blotcheye soldierfish)
 Myripristis botche G. Cuvier, 1829 (Blacktip soldierfish)
 Myripristis chryseres D. S. Jordan & Evermann, 1903 (Yellowfin soldierfish)
 Myripristis clarionensis C. H. Gilbert, 1897 (Yellow soldierfish)
 Myripristis earlei J. E. Randall, G. R. Allen & D. R. Robertson, 2003 (Earle's soldierfish)
 Myripristis formosa J. E. Randall & D. W. Greenfield, 1996
 Myripristis gildi D. W. Greenfield, 1965 (Clipperton cardinal soldierfish)
 Myripristis greenfieldi J. E. Randall & Yamakawa, 1996
 Myripristis hexagona (Lacépède, 1802) (Doubletooth soldierfish)
 Myripristis jacobus G. Cuvier, 1829 (Blackbar soldierfish)
 Myripristis kochiensis J. E. Randall & Yamakawa, 1996
 Myripristis kuntee Valenciennes, 1831 (Shoulderbar soldierfish)
 Myripristis leiognathus Valenciennes, 1846 (Panamic soldierfish)
 Myripristis murdjan (Forsskål, 1775) (Pinecone soldierfish)
 Myripristis pralinia G. Cuvier, 1829 (Scarlet soldierfish)
 Myripristis randalli D. W. Greenfield, 1974
 Myripristis robusta J. E. Randall & D. W. Greenfield, 1996
 Myripristis seychellensis G. Cuvier, 1829 (Seychelles soldier)
 Myripristis tiki D. W. Greenfield, 1974 (Tiki soldierfish)
 Myripristis trachyacron Bleeker, 1863
 Myripristis violacea Bleeker, 1851 (Lattice soldierfish)
 Myripristis vittata Valenciennes, 1831 (Whitetip soldierfish)
 Myripristis woodsi D. W. Greenfield, 1974 (Whitespot soldierfish)
 Myripristis xanthacra J. E. Randall & Guézé, 1981 (Yellowtip soldierfish)

References

 
Ray-finned fish genera
Taxa named by Georges Cuvier